"Skeleton Boy" is the third single by Friendly Fires taken from the band's self-titled debut album Friendly Fires. It was released on 
2 March 2009 in the UK and 1 March 2009 in the United States. This version of the song was produced by Paul Epworth and was used in the promotional video for the song.  This version is different from the version on the album that was produced by singer Ed Macfarlane, in that it is 30 seconds longer than the original version and features an extended instrumental bridge.

The song is featured on the soundtrack of NHL 2K10 and NBA 2K12. The song reappeared in NBA 2K16.

Track listing
12" Vinyl Release
 "Skeleton Boy" (Zio's Stellar Extended Remix) - 9:18
 "Skeleton Boy" (Air France Remix) - 4:59Digital Download'''
 "Skeleton Boy" - 4:05
 "Skeleton Boy" (Zio's Stellar Extended Remix) - 9:18
 "Skeleton Boy" (Air France Remix) - 4:59

Charts

References

2009 singles
2008 songs
XL Recordings singles
Friendly Fires songs